The Silicon Disk System was the first commercially available RAM disk for microcomputers.

It was written by Jerry Karlin in 1979/80. Karlin was joined by Peter Cheesewright, and their company Microcosm Research Ltd. marketed the product for a number of years. The product was available as a standalone and also bundled with a number of different microcomputers and RAM-board products. Later, the Silicon Disk System was sold by Microcosm Ltd. Initially, it was available for the CP/M operating system. Versions for the MP/M, CP/M-86, and MP/M-86 operating systems followed. Following the launch of the IBM PC, a version for the MS-DOS and PC DOS operating systems was produced.

References 

Computer memory
Solid-state computer storage media